Love Creek is a creek in California. It starts around 1,000 feet above sea level, flows southward through the town of Ben Lomond, California in Santa Cruz County, California, and enters the San Lorenzo River south of Ben Lomond. It is actually on the higher ground side of the business district, which makes the possibility of flooding serious.

On the night of 5 January 1982, thirty homes were destroyed and ten people killed by a massive mudslide.

Etymology
Love Creek gets the name from Captain Harry Love who, in 1853, was in charge of the California Rangers to track down the bandit Joaquin Murieta (some spell it Murrieta). He later moved to the Santa Cruz Mountains and built a sawmill on a stream this stream that was later named for him.

History 
Love Creek is remembered because of the landslide in 1982. Quoted from, U.S. Department of the Interior, U.S. Geological Survey USGS Premiers Documentary Film on "Landslide Danger in the Bay Area" 2/20/2007: "In January 1982 a single, catastrophic rainstorm triggered 18,000 landslides throughout the San Francisco Bay Area. The most destructive of these landslides was in the Love Creek area of the Santa Cruz Mountains, where a 1000-foot slab of heavily wooded hill slope crashed down without warning on sleeping residents of Love Creek Heights. Ten of the Love Creek residents were buried by the slide."

In 1976 the Santa Cruz county officials had started to contract for the services of an environmental consulting firm with Michael C. Moore and Bruce W. Stenman, to use the newly declassified NASA satellite photos of the county to conduct a mapping and on the ground assessment of stability. The county officials cancelled the survey after local real estate developers expressed strong opposition. A survey of unsafe areas would have limited the ability of the developers to build roads and homes in the mountainous areas of Santa Cruz county. A later study was done but without the requisite verification on the ground and so it was not an accurate survey of area. 

Love Creek flooding and landslides took place in an area that had been stable for centuries prior to the logging and removal of the redwoods which continues to the present day. Santa Cruz county officials approved the building of roads and homes while ignoring the hazardous conditions being created with this change in the landscape. This was a man made disaster.

References

External links 
 Love Creek, Santa Cruz on localwiki

Rivers of Santa Cruz County, California
Rivers of Northern California
Tributaries of the San Lorenzo River